(Die) Hunnenschlacht (German for "[the] battle of the Huns") may refer to:

Hlöðskviða, sometimes called Hunnenschlacht, an Old Norse epic poem
Hunnenschlacht, an 1854 fresco by Wilhelm von Kaulbach
Hunnenschlacht (Liszt), an 1857 symphonic poem inspired by the painting

See also

Battle of the Catalaunian Plains (451), major historical battle of the Huns